Khaled Jamal Abdulrahman Salem (born 17 November 1989) is a Palestinian footballer who plays for Bahraini Premier League club Al-Hidd and the Palestine national team.

Club career 
On 24 May 2021, he led his team to their first AFC Cup victory over Bahrain's Al-Muharraq 3–2 by scoring all three goals.

A few days later, he moved abroad, where he signed with Al-Hidd.

International career 
Salem received his first national team cap against Indonesia on 22 August 2011.

Career statistics

International 
Scores and results list Palestine's goal tally first.

Honours
Palestine
 Bangabandhu Cup: 2020

References

External links 
 
 

1989 births
Living people
People from Nablus
Palestinian footballers
Association football forwards
Markaz Tulkarem players
Shabab Al-Dhahiriya SC players
Hilal Al-Quds Club players
Markaz Balata players
Shabab Al-Khalil SC players
West Bank Premier League players
Palestine youth international footballers
Palestine international footballers
2015 AFC Asian Cup players
2019 AFC Asian Cup players
Palestinian expatriate footballers
Expatriate sportspeople in Bahrain
Palestinian expatriate sportspeople in Bahrain